The Rimshots were an American funk and disco band, popular in the late 1970s.  The group started out as the house band for the labels All Platinum Records and in particular, Stang Records in the early 1970s.  The (then nameless) rhythm section recorded for the artists signed to the company (including Hank Ballard, Donnie Elbert, Shirley & Company, Chuck Jackson, Brook Benton, Solomon Burke, Brother to Brother, Eleanor Mills, The Moments, and Etta James).  Along with King Curtis, they recorded the original theme song for the 1971 hit television show, Soul Train.

From 1972 to 1976, this studio band recorded over fifty projects for Platinum-Chess Records. The group also had the ability to accurately replicate rhythm tracks previously recorded by other artists.  Joe Robinson, the company's president, had the group reproduce an American hit, "7-6-5-4-3-2-1 (Blow Your Whistle)", and released the single in Europe under the artist name 'The Rimshots'; and that is when the rhythm section's new identity was launched.  The group became a reluctant new artist and began touring internationally as The Rimshots, appearing twice on the UK's BBC Television, Top of the Pops, and other international venues.  Despite their unwitting success as a disco group, their studio discography is unparalleled by their limited recordings under this name.

Their original music tended toward a hard funk sound, mainly influenced by three musicians who formed the core of the group.  Guitarist Walter Morris, bassist Jonathan Williams, and drummer Clarence Oliver (all from the Richmond, Virginia area) were the original stage band for The Moments.  Keyboardist, Bernadette Randle (St. Louis, Missouri), was brought to the studio by owner, Sylvia Robinson and the record producer, Michael Burton ("Pillow Talk" collaborators).  Rhythm guitarist, Tommy Keith (Philadelphia, Pennsylvania) was under contract to the recording company as a writer and producer. Organist, Mozart Pierre Louis (Haiti) performed with the group on stage, but did not record with them in the studio.  In this six-man configuration, they toured as The Moments' band throughout the 1970s.  By the mid 1970s, however, the group became recognized as a disco band, due in large part to the European success of the "Blow Your Whistle" cover.  They also scored a few chart hits of their original tunes.  "Do What You Feel (Part 1)" (written by Walter Morris) reached #93 on the US Billboard charts, and "Super Disco" (written by Tommy Keith) reached #49 R&B, and #7 on the Disco Singles chart.  When Randle left the company, she was replaced by Sammy Lowe Jr. during the year or so the group remained intact. (His father, Sammy Lowe Sr., was the Platinum-Chess orchestrator for over ten years.)

The group was eventually sampled extensively by hip-hop artists.

Members
Walter Morris - lead guitar
Tommy Keith - rhythm guitar
Clarence Oliver - drums
Jonathan Williams - bass
Bernadette Randle - keyboards
Mozart Pierre Louis - organ

Discography

Albums
Soul Train (1972)
Down to Earth (1976) U.S. R&B #41

Singles

" " Save that Thing" (1972) - USA

" "7-6-5-4-3-2-1 (Blow Your Whistle)" (1975) - UK #26

References

American funk musical groups
American disco groups
All Platinum artists